LG Display (Korean: LG 디스플레이) is one of the world's largest manufacturers and supplier of thin-film transistor liquid crystal display (TFT-LCD) panels, OLEDs and flexible displays. LG Display is headquartered in Seoul, South Korea, and currently operates nine fabrication facilities and seven back-end assembly facilities in Korea, China, Poland and Mexico.

History 
LG Display was originally formed as a joint venture by the Korean electronics company LG Electronics and the Dutch company Philips in 1999 to manufacture active matrix liquid crystal displays (LCDs) and was formerly known as LG.Philips LCD, but Philips sold off all its shares in late 2008. Both companies also had another joint venture, called LG.Philips Displays, dedicated to manufacturing cathode ray tubes, deflection yokes, and related materials such as glass and phosphors.

On 12 December 2008, LG.Philips LCD announced its plan to change its corporate name to LG Display upon receiving approval at the company's annual general meeting of shareholders on 29 February. The corporation stated that the modification in its name reflects its broadened business scope and diversified business model, as well as the change in corporate governance resulting from the decline in Philips' equity stake, and LG's dedication to better responsible management.

The company has eight manufacturing plants in Gumi and Paju, South Korea. It also has a module assembly plant in Nanjing and Guangzhou in China and Wroclaw in Poland.

LG Display became an independent company in July 2004 when it was concurrently listed on the New York Stock Exchange and the South Korean Stock Exchange.

They are one of the main licensed manufacturers of the more color-accurate IPS panels used by Dell, NEC, ASUS, Apple (including iMacs, iPads, iPhones, iPod Touches) and others, which were developed by Hitachi.

LCD price fixing 
In December 2010, the EU fined LG Display €215 million for its part in an LCD price fixing scheme. Other companies were fined for a combined total of €648.9 million, including Chimei Innolux, AU Optronics, Chunghwa Picture Tubes Ltd., and HannStar Display Corp. LG Display has said it is considering appealing the fine.

This followed the 2008 case in the US, when LG Display Co., Chunghwa Picture Tubes and Sharp Corp., agreed to plead guilty and pay $585 million in criminal fines for conspiring to fix prices of liquid crystal display panels.

LG Display would pay $400 million, the second-highest criminal fine that the US Justice Department antitrust division had ever imposed. Chunghwa would pay $65 million for conspiring with LG Display and other unnamed companies and Sharp would pay $120 million, according to the department.

See also
 LG Group
 Digital Fine Contrast
 Economy of South Korea
 IPS Panel
 Film-type Patterned Retarder

References

External links 

 

Manufacturing companies based in Seoul
Electronics companies established in 1999
Companies listed on the Korea Exchange
Companies listed on the New York Stock Exchange
Display technology companies
Electronics companies of South Korea
LG Corporation
South Korean companies established in 1999